Process tracing is a research method used to develop and test theories. It is generally understood as a "within-case" method to draw inferences on the basis of causal mechanisms. It has been used in social sciences (such as in psychology), as well as in natural sciences. 

Scholars that use process tracing evaluate the weight of evidence on the basis of the strength of tests (notably straw-in-the-wind tests, hoop tests, smoking gun tests, double decisive tests). As a consequence, what matters is not solely the quantity of observations, but the quality and manner of observations. By using Bayesian probability, it may be possible to make strong causal inferences from a small sliver of data through process tracing. As a result, process tracing is a prominent case study method.

Process tracing
Process-tracing can be used both for inductive (theory-generating) and deductive (theory-testing) purposes.

In terms of theory-testing, the process-tracing method works by presenting the observable implications (hypotheses) of a theory, as well as alternative explanations that are inconsistent with the theory. Once these observable implications are presented, they are then tested empirically to see which of the observable implications can be observed and which cannot. Process-tracing emphasizes the temporal sequence of events, and requires fine-grained case knowledge.

Stephen Van Evera's influential typology of process-tracing tests distinguishes tests depending on how they adjudicate between theoretical expectations:

 Straw-in-the-wind tests: Failure or passage of this test neither lends strong support for or against the theory
 Hoop tests: Failure to pass a hoop test can be disqualifying for a theory but passing the hoop test does not necessarily lend strong support for the theory
 Smoking gun tests: Passing a smoking gun test lends strong support for theory, whereas failure does not necessarily lend strong support against the theory
 Double decisive tests: Passing a double decisive test lends strong support for the theory while also lending strong support against alternative theories

It is often used to complement comparative case study methods. By tracing the causal process from the independent variable of interest to the dependent variable, it may be possible to rule out potentially intervening variables in imperfectly matched cases. This can create a stronger basis for attributing causal significance to the remaining independent variables.

A limitation to process-tracing is the problem of infinite regress. While some influential works by methods scholars have argued that the ability of process-tracing to make causal claims is limited by low degrees of freedom, methodologists widely reject that the "degrees of freedom" problem applies to research that uses process-tracing, given that qualitative research entails different logics than quantitative research (where scholars do need to be wary of degrees of freedom). 

One advantage to process-tracing over quantitative methods is that process-tracing provides inferential leverage. In addition to aiding uncovering and testing causal mechanisms, process-tracing also contributes descriptive richness.

By assigning probabilities to outcomes under specific conditions, scholars can use Bayesian rules in their process tracing to draw robust conclusions about the causes of outcomes. For example, if a scholar's theory assumes that a number of observable implications will happen under certain conditions, then the repeated occurrence of those outcomes under the theorized conditions lends strong support for the scholar's theory because the observed outcomes would be improbable to occur in the manner expected by the scholar if the theory were false. By using Bayesian probability, it may be possible to make strong causal inferences from a small sliver of data. For example, a video recording of a person committing a bank robbery can be very strong evidence that a particular person committed the robbery while also ruling out that other potential suspects did it, even if it is only a single piece of evidence.

Scholars can also use set theory in their process tracing.

See also

 Case study
 Qualitative research

References

Further reading
 Bennett, A. and A.L. George (2001). "Case Studies and Process Tracing in History and Political Science: Similar Strokes for Different Foci" in C. Elman and M.F.  Elman (eds.) Bridges and Boundaries: Historians, Political Scientists, and the Study of International Relations. MIT Press pp. 137–166.
 Checkel. J. T. (2006) "Tracing Causal Mechanisms." The International Studies Review 8: 362-370.
 Checkel, J. T. (2008) "Process Tracing." in A. Klotz and D. Prakash (eds.) Qualitative Methods in International Relations: A Pluralist Guide. Palgrave. pp. 114–129.
 Vennesson, P. and I. Wiesner (2014) "Process Tracing in Case Studies." in J. Soeters, P. Shields and S Reitjens (eds) Routledge Handbook of Research Methods in Military Studies. Routledge. pp. 92–103.

Political science
Psychological methodology